Giorgio Marras (born 15 October 1971 in Marrubiu) is a retired Italian sprinter who specialized in the 200 metres.

Biography
He won a bronze medal in 4 x 100 metres relay at the 1994 European Championships, together with teammates Ezio Madonia, Domenico Nettis and Sandro Floris. He also finished fourth in 200 metres at the 1992 European Indoor Championships.

His personal best 200 metres time is 20.48 seconds, achieved in July 1994 in Sestriere. His personal best 100 metres time is 10.32 seconds, achieved in July 1993 in Nuoro.

Achievements

National titles
He has won 4 times the individual national championship.
3 wins in the 200 metres (1992, 1993, 1994)
1 win in the 200 metres  indoor (1994)

See also
 Italian all-time lists - 200 metres
 Italy national relay team

References

External links
 

1971 births
Living people
Italian male sprinters
People from the Province of Oristano
Athletics competitors of Fiamme Oro
European Athletics Championships medalists
Sportspeople from Sardinia
Italian Athletics Championships winners